Godi media (idiomatic equivalent: 'lapdog media';) is a pejorative term coined and popularized by ex-NDTV journalist Ravish Kumar, for the sensationalist and biased Indian print and TV news media, which supports the currently ruling NDA government (since 2014). The term is a pun on the name of Indian Prime Minister Narendra Modi and has become a common way to refer to television and other media that are perceived as mouthpieces of the ruling party in India.

Background 
As per an opinion piece by Debasish Roy Chowdhury for Time magazine, Modi's ascension to national power in 2014 led to the taming of India's media. His rise coincided with a reorganization of the editorial authority of some of India's most important news institutions, particularly national television networks. The previous generation of senior editors, who were viewed as more devoted to India's liberal outlook than the BJP's Hindu nationalist ideology, were moved out, and new channels and news leaders with devotion to the BJP and Modi were developed. Because of their large state and party advertising budgets, India's state and central governments hold considerable control over media companies. Access to power and business favours are additional incentives for the media to continue with the pro-BJP messages. This ensures that bad news never affects the government or goes public. With a few exceptions, the government has made sure that the media outlets that seek government approval for their reporting.

Coinage
The term was coined and popularized by NDTV journalist Ravish Kumar, in reference to the sensationalist and biased Indian print and TV news media supporting the currently ruling NDA government. The term literally translates to "media sitting on the lap". In one of his shows, Kumar used silent actors to mime "godi media". This was accompanied by miming what the currently ruling party leaders wanted to listen to, using the Hindi film song "Bago Mein Bahar Hai".

Usage and popularity
In 2018, on World Press Freedom Day, many journalists and social activists held a demonstration which protested, among other things, against the "godi media". The term was also widely used at the time of the Citizenship Amendment Act protests, and the 2020–2021 Indian farmers' protest, with the claim that the protest and the farmers were not being represented fairly.

Detractors of "godi media" allege that instead of practicing honest journalism, such media publishes fake news and inflammatory stories, which are often untrue, working in the interest of BJP government, corporate and elite sources for their own benefit. According to a Time article, these media outlets also tend to exaggerate the BJP government's achievements and either brush aside over its failures or find ways to blame them on Modi's discontents.

Rajdeep Sardesai, an Indian news anchor and author, said that "a large section of the Indian media… has become a lap dog, not a watchdog".

See also 
 Tukde Tukde Gang
 Pseudo-secularism
Fake news in India
Manufacturing Consent
Media bias
Politico-media complex
Presstitute
Trolley Times
Yellow journalism
Anti-national (India)
Urban Naxals

References

Further reading 
 

 
 
 
 
Malik, Shahnawaz Ahmed, Fake News: Legal Analysis of False and Misleading News and Cyber Propaganda (5 February 2019). Ad Valorem, Journal of Law: Volume 6: Issue II: Part-III: April–June 2019: ISSN : 2348–5485.
Arun, Chinmayi, On WhatsApp, Rumours, Lynchings, and the Indian Government (3 January 2019). Economic and Political Weekly. no. 6.
Nagar, Itisha and Gill, Simran, Head is Where the Herd is: Fake News and Effect of Online Social Conformity on Islamophobia in Indians. SSHO-D-20-00611, Available at SSRN:  or Head is Where the Herd is: Fake News and Effect of Online Social Conformity on Islamophobia in Indians

External links

 
 The LampPost (21 September 2022) सुप्रीम कोर्ट ने लगाई फटकार, क्या अब सुधरेंगे दलाल पत्रकार?':The LampPost website 

Fake news
Disinformation
Misinformation
Propaganda in India
Right-wing politics in India